USS Dohema Jr. (SP-612) was a United States Navy patrol vessel in commission from 1917 to 1918.

Dohema Jr. was built as a private motorboat of the same name by her owner, Edwin Binney of Sound Beach, Connecticut, in 1912. In 1917, the U.S. Navy acquired her under a free lease from Binney for use as a section patrol boat during World War I. She was commissioned as USS Dohema Jr. (SP-612) on 2 June 1917.

Assigned to the 4th Naval District, Dohema Jr. performed patrol duty in the Delaware River and Delaware Bay and transported Navy personnel within the naval district for the rest of World War I.

Dohema Jr. was decommissioned on 27 November 1918 and returned to Binney the same day.

References

Department of the Navy Naval History and Heritage Command Online Library of Selected Images: U.S. Navy Ships: USS Dohema Jr. (SP-612), 1917-1918. Originally Dohema Jr. (American Motor Pleasure Boat, 1912)
NavSource Online: Section Patrol Craft Photo Archive Dohema Jr. (SP 612)

Patrol vessels of the United States Navy
World War I patrol vessels of the United States
Ships built in Connecticut
1912 ships